El pecado de Adán y Eva (English: The Sin of Adam and Eve) is a Mexican biblical epic film from 1969.

Production background
The film, directed by Miguel Zacarías, retells the biblical story of Adam and Eve. Mexican actor Jorge Rivero played Adam, while newcomer Candice 'Candy' Wilson played Eve. There are no other actors in the film. The movie is largely silent, with the actors gesturing and calling each other's names to communicate. The film has some opening narration, as well as the voice of God saying a few phrases from the heavens.

The film gained notoriety because Rivero and Wilson appear nude throughout most of the film.

References

External links

1969 films
Mexican historical drama films
1960s Spanish-language films
Films based on the Book of Genesis
Films directed by Miguel Zacarías
Cultural depictions of Adam and Eve
Dimension Pictures films
1960s Mexican films